Rigoberto Mendoza may refer to:

 Rigoberto Mendoza (basketball) (born 1992), Dominican basketball player
 Rigoberto Mendoza (marathon), Cuban retired marathon runner